Major General Md. Main Ullah Chowdhury, SUP, OSP, awc, psc is a two star commissioned flag officer in the INFANTRY REGIMENT. He is currently acting Force Commander of the United Nations Mission for Referendum in Western Sahara (MINURSO). Earlier, he served as deputy Force Commander, United Nations Mission in South Sudan (UNMISS). Prior to join UNMISS,  he served as GOC of 10th Infantry Division of Bangladesh Army.

Education 
Major General Md. Main Ullah Chowdhury received an undergraduate degree from Defence Services Command and Staff College. He holds a Master’s degree in Strategic Studies from USAWC as well as in Defense Studies from the National University of Bangladesh.

Military career 
Major General Md. Main Ullah Chowdhury was commissioned into Bangladesh Army as an officer with 17th BMA Long Course. He held staff positions in the field and at headquarters. He was the GOC of 10th Infantry Division. He had been the commandant of Bangladesh Military Academy. He also served as the GOC of 7th Infantry Division.

References 

Bangladesh Army generals
Living people
Year of birth missing (living people)
National Defence College (Bangladesh) alumni